The Malabar flameback (Chrysocolaptes socialis) is a species of bird in the woodpecker family Picidae. It is endemic to the Western Ghats of India.

It was previously considered a subspecies of the greater flameback (C. guttacristatus), but was split as a distinct species by the International Ornithological Congress in 2022 based on a 2021 study noting differences in plumage and vocalizations between both species.

References

Malabar flameback
Malabar flameback
Malabar flameback
Malabar flameback